The Orlando Titans was a lacrosse team based in Orlando, Florida playing in the National Lacrosse League (NLL). The 2010 season was their only season in Orlando. The franchise previously played three seasons in New York City as the New York Titans.

Regular season

Conference standings

Game log
Reference:

Playoffs

Game log
Reference:

Transactions

Entry draft
The 2009 NLL Entry Draft took place on September 9, 2009. The Titans selected the following players:

Roster

See also
2010 NLL season

References

Orlando
Orlando Titans seasons
2010 in sports in Florida